A job description or JD is a written narrative that describes the general tasks, or other related duties, and responsibilities of a position. It may specify the functionary to whom the position reports, specifications such as the qualifications or skills needed by the person in the job, information about the equipment, tools and work aids used, working conditions, physical demands, and a salary range. Job descriptions are usually narrative,
but some may comprise a simple list of competencies; for instance, strategic human resource planning methodologies may be used to develop a competency architecture for an organization, from which job descriptions are built as a shortlist of competencies.

According to Torrington, a job description is usually developed by conducting a job analysis, which includes examining the tasks and sequences of tasks necessary to perform the job. The analysis considers the areas of knowledge, skills and abilities needed to perform the job. Job analysis generally involves the following steps: collecting and recording job information; checking the job information for accuracy; writing job descriptions based on the information; using the information to determine what skills, abilities, and knowledge are required to perform the job; updating the information from time to time.  A job usually includes several roles. 
According to Hall, the job description might be broadened to form a person specification or may be known as "terms of reference". The person/job specification can be presented as a stand-alone document, but in practice it is usually included within the job description.  A job description is often used by employers in the recruitment process.

Roles and responsibilities

A job description may include relationships with other people in the organization: Supervisory level, managerial requirements, and relationships with other colleagues.

Development goals

A job description need not be limited to explaining the current situation, or work that is currently expected; it may also set out goals for what might be achieved in the future, such as possible promotions routes and conditions.

Limitations
Prescriptive job descriptions may be seen as a hindrance in certain circumstances:
 Job descriptions may not be suitable for some senior managers as they should have the freedom to take the initiative and find fruitful new directions;
 Job descriptions may be too inflexible in a rapidly changing organization, for instance in an area subject to rapid technological change;
 Other changes in job content may lead to the job description being out of date;
 The process that an organization uses to create job descriptions may not be optimal.

Job description management
Job description management is the creation and maintenance of job descriptions within an organization.  A job description is a document listing the tasks, duties, and responsibilities of a specific job. Having up-to-date, accurate and professionally written job descriptions is critical to an organization’s ability to attract qualified candidates, orient & train employees, establish job performance standards, develop compensation programs, conduct performance reviews, set goals and meet legal requirements.

Process
Prior to the development of the job description, a job analysis must be conducted.  Job analysis, an integral part of HR management, is the gathering, analysis and documentation of the important facets of a job including what the employee does, the context of the job, and the requirements of the job.

Once the job analysis is complete, the job description including the job specification can be developed.  A job description describes the activities to be performed and a job specification lists the knowledge, skills and abilities required to perform the job.  A job description contains several sections including an identification section, a general summary, essential functions and duties, job specifications, and disclaimers and approvals.

Job descriptions are then used to develop effective EEO/ADA, HR planning, recruiting, and selection initiatives; to maintain clear continuity between compensation planning, training efforts, and performance management; and to identify job factors that may contribute to workplace safety and health and employee/labor relations.

Impact of the Internet
Job description management, as well as other facets of talent management, has been affected by the expansion of information technology.  Prior to 2000, there were very few Internet-based human resource solutions available to human resource departments. HR departments often stored their printed job descriptions either in filing cabinets or Word-based job descriptions on computers or company servers.  Today there are countless companies offering cloud-based talent management systems to businesses allowing HR to easily store HR information, collaborate with other departments, and access files from any device with Internet access.

Benefits
A job description is essential to ensure clarity of why the role exists. It can be used:

 To provide the employee with the expectations that are required of them in the role
 To provide enough detail to help the candidate assess if they are suitable for the position
 To help formulate questions for the interview process
 To allow the prospective employee to determine their role or standing within the structure of the organisation
 To assist in forming a legally binding contract of employment
 To help set goals and target for the employee upon joining
 To aid in the evaluation of the employee’s job performance
 To help formulate training and development plans

Legality
Well organized and up-to-date job descriptions assist in legal and regulatory compliance.  In the United States, for example, the 1978 Uniform Guidelines on Employee Selection Procedure was developed in order to standardize the employee selection process and makes it clear that HR requirements must be linked with job-related factors.  The Americans with Disabilities Act of 1990 (ADA) requires organizations to identify essential job functions and document the steps taken to identify job responsibilities while Fair Labor Standards Act (FLSA) requires HR managers to determine if a job is to be classified as exempt or non-exempt.

Healthcare organizations not only have to comply with labor laws but also have to comply with healthcare laws and accreditation agencies.  The Joint Commission (Joint Commission on Accreditation of Healthcare Organizations) accredits and certifies thousands of healthcare organizations around the United States. Their mission is "To continuously improve health care for the public, in collaboration with other stakeholders, by evaluating health care organizations and inspiring them to excel in providing safe and effective care of the highest quality and value". To meet Joint Commission guidelines, healthcare organizations must maintain up-to-date, accurate, complete and properly written job descriptions.

The above regulations require businesses to keep clear records of their job descriptions.  Having a well-organized automated system helps eliminate some of the panic associated with a compliance audit.

See also

References

 Mathis, Robert L., and John H. Jackson. Human Resource Management. 11th ed. Mason: Thomson South-Western, 2006. 175-87. Print.
 Guide To Writing Job Descriptions. UCLA, n.d. Web. 13 Dec. 2011. <http://www.college.ucla.edu/personnel/jobdesc/intro.asp>.
 The Fair Labor Standards Act. United States Department of Labor, n.d. Web. 13 Dec. 2011. <https://web.archive.org/web/20080913163053/http://www.dol.gov/compliance/laws/comp-flsa.htm>.
 About The Joint Commission. The Joint Commission, 2011. Web. 13 Dec. 2011. <http://www.jointcommission.org/about_us/about_the_joint_commission_main.aspx>.

Recruitment